The 2011 Wuxi Classic was a professional non-ranking snooker tournament held between 7–10 July 2011 at the Wuxi City Sports Park Stadium in Wuxi, China.

Shaun Murphy was the defending champion, but he lost in the semi-finals 3–6 against Ali Carter. Mark Selby won in the final 9–7 against Carter.

Prize fund
The breakdown of prize money for this year is shown below: 
Winner: £20,000
Runner-Up: £10,000
Semi-final: £5,000
Quarter-final: £2,500
Last 12: £1,250
Highest break: £1,000
Total: £56,000

Main draw

Final

Century breaks

 137  Ding Junhui
 134, 100  Mark Selby
 124, 107  Stephen Maguire
 113, 107  Peter Ebdon
 102  Shaun Murphy
 101  Ali Carter

References

2011
Wuxi Classic
Wuxi Classic